Puranam Srinivasa Sastry (1 June 1953 – October 22 2021) was an Indian writer and a senior Journalist in the Telugu language. He was also a poet, editor, journalist, YouTuber, translator, columnist, humorist, political analyst, and canvas artist.

Career

He worked at the newspaper Eenadu in the town of Visakhapatnam for a brief period and for Andhra Bhoomi, a Telugu daily, as a chief sub-editor for its Hyderabad edition. He also worked for the Deccan Chronicle, Andhra Bhoomi, Vaartha, Andhra Prabha, Prajasakti and Eevaram. He last worked at Mana Telangana (formerly Visalandhra). Sastry was a freelance news announcer at All India Radio and co-founder of a Telugu literary and cultural club called  Kokilam which is now also a YouTube channel for Literary, Social and Cultural works.

Literary works
He was the author of several books including the psychological thriller - Ennenno Athmahatyalu (English: Many Suicides), Goodu Chalani Sukham, Preminchaku Jwaram Ostundi and Coffee Ragalu. Ennenno Athmahatyalu and Goodu Chalani Sukham won awards and were translated into Hindi, Sanskrit and Kannada. He had published under the pen-names Srisaa, Puranam Srisaa, and P.S. He was interviewed by Gollapudi Maruthi Rao for Vandella Kathaku Vandanalu program aired in HMTV.

Some of his works were also published on online magazines Sanchika.

Personal life
Sastry married Suseela in 1979 and has three children.Short stories compilations by Mr. Puranam5 set of Stories by Mr. Puranam

References

Telugu writers
Journalists from Andhra Pradesh
Indian male journalists
Living people
People from West Godavari district
1953 births